Munchingi puttu is a village and a Mandal in Alluri Sitharama Raju district in the state of Andhra Pradesh in India.

References 

Villages in Alluri Sitharama Raju district
Mandals in Alluri Sitharama Raju district